Legislative elections were held in French Polynesia on 29 May 1977 for the Territorial Assembly. Autonomist parties won a majority, with the United Front of Francis Sanford winning 13 seats and Sanford allies a further five.

Contesting parties
Prior to the elections, Sanford formed the United Front for Internal Autonomy alliance, consisting of Here Ai'a, E'a Api and other minor parties, although E'a Api ran separately in the Leeward Islands, Marquesas and the Tuamotu–Gambier Islands constituency.

The Tahoera'a Huiraatira party was formed as a successor to the Tahoeraa Maohi alliance of the Tahitian Union and Union for the New Republic.

Results

Elected members

Aftermath
Following the elections, Frantz Vanizette was chosen as the President of the Assembly. Sanford and Jean Juventin were appointed to the Government Council and were replaced in the Assembly by Paul Pietri and André Toomaru.

References

French
1977 in French Polynesia
Elections in French Polynesia
May 1977 events in Oceania
Election and referendum articles with incomplete results